Aralobatrachus is an extinct genus of prehistoric amphibian known from Uzbekistan.

See also
 Prehistoric amphibian
 List of prehistoric amphibians

References

Cretaceous frogs
Late Cretaceous amphibians
Turonian life
Prehistoric amphibians of Asia
Fossils of Uzbekistan
Bissekty Formation
Fossil taxa described in 1981